The Primero River ('First River'), also known as Suquía (the name used by the Comechingones, the indigenous people), runs through the city of Córdoba, Argentina.

The tributaries of the Primero (mainly the San Roque and Cosquín rivers) flow into the San Roque Reservoir; from there, the Primero goes east into the plains surrounding the city of Córdoba.

Once inside the city, the river channels into La Cañada, a waterway delineated by a stonework canal built through the downtown area, and inaugurated in 1944. About  to the east, Isla de los Patos (Ducks Island) was repopulated with ducks and swans in the 1980s. During the crisis years of 1988–91 and 2001–02, the duck population was devastated, allegedly by people desperately looking for food. It was reported in March 2006 that a large number of ducks had died due to unspecified causes.  Pollution by chemical waste is suspected as the cause, but avian influenza is also being investigated as a possible cause.

Beyond the city limits, the river flows towards the Algarrobos swamp and ends its course on the southern coast of the Mar Chiquita (or Mar de Ansenuza) salt lake.

Pollution of the water and of the riverbank is a major environmental issue in Córdoba. Periodic cleaning operations are carried out to increase the quality of the water and to preserve the viability of fishing, both in the San Roque reservoir area and downstream.

References

External links
Detail of all inflows into Lake Ansenuza 

Rivers of Argentina
Rivers of Córdoba Province, Argentina